Secret Diary of a Call Girl is a British television drama broadcast on ITV2 based on the blog and books by the pseudonymous "Belle de Jour," starring Billie Piper as "Belle", a high-class London call girl. The series was written by Lucy Prebble, who is also known as the author of The Sugar Syndrome and ENRON. The series has been compared to Sex and the City by many critics, mainly due to its humorous approach to sex. The third series began on 28 January 2010, on ITV2. The fourth and final series began on 1 February 2011, on ITV2.

Series overview

Episodes

Series 1 (2007)

Series 2 (2008)

Billie and the Real Belle Bare All (2010) 

Billie and the Real Belle Bare All is a one-off television program that aired on ITV2 on 25 January 2010, ahead of the Series 3 premiere of Secret Diary of a Call Girl. The program, which took place at The May Fair, consisted of Billie Piper, who stars as Hannah Baxter in Secret Diary of a Call Girl, interviewing Dr. Brooke Magnanti, a former call girl who, until November 2009 remained anonymous known only by the pseudonym "Belle de Jour".

Series 3 (2010)

Series 4 (2011)

References

External links 
 
 

Secret Diary of a Call Girl episodes, List of